Domen Gril (born 10 June 2001) is a Slovenian footballer who plays as a goalkeeper for Portuguese club Académico de Viseu.

Club career

Bravo
Gril joined Bravo in 2016 at the age of 15 from Bistrica. On 26 September 2018, 17-year old Gril made his official debut for Bravo against Dob in the Slovenian Second League. He played 18 league games in that season and helped the team promoting to the Slovenian PrvaLiga.

TSG 1899 Hoffenheim
At the end of the 2019 summer transfer window, German club TSG 1899 Hoffenheim showed interest in Gril. However, he stayed in Bravo. But the rumors appeared again in November 2019, saying that Hoffenheim already had an agreement with Bravo for the transfer of Gril. The deal was officially announced on 13 December 2019 and became a record deal for Bravo.

Gril signed a deal with Hoffenheim until the summer 2024 but stayed on loan at Bravo for the rest of the season. He played only one game during the last six months of his time at Bravo, before returning to Hoffenheim in July 2020. In September 2020, he struggled with back problems which kept him out for some time.

On 25 August 2021, Gril signed with Académico de Viseu on loan until the end of the 2021–22 season.

References

External links
 

2001 births
Living people
Sportspeople from Maribor
Slovenian footballers
Association football goalkeepers
Slovenia youth international footballers
Slovenia under-21 international footballers
NK Bravo players
TSG 1899 Hoffenheim II players
Académico de Viseu F.C. players
Slovenian Second League players
Slovenian PrvaLiga players
Liga Portugal 2 players
Slovenian expatriate footballers
Slovenian expatriate sportspeople in Germany
Expatriate footballers in Germany
Slovenian expatriate sportspeople in Portugal
Expatriate footballers in Portugal